The Coffee Club is an Australian multinational coffeehouse-style café chain. Originally created in 1989 as a place to get "an excellent coffee",  the concept includes cafébar/restaurant stores with expanded menus and full table service. In 2005, The Coffee Club franchise was brought to New Zealand by 
Brad Jacobs and Andy Lucas opening their first store in Wellington. As of 2021, they have over 65 stores all around New Zealand.

History
In 1989, friends Emmanuel Kokoris and Emmanuel Drivas were searching for a late-night cup of coffee in Brisbane. Their unsuccessful attempt led them to plan a new business venture: The Coffee Club, which rested on the Greek concept of 'philoxenia' - hospitality to strangers.

The first store opened on 2 November 1989 at Eagle Street Pier in Brisbane.

On 1 July 1994 The Coffee Club became a franchise.

In November 2005 the first international store was opened in Wellington, New Zealand, by master franchisees Bradley Jacobs and Andy Lucas. As of May 2019, they have operated 64 cafes throughout New Zealand.

In October 2007, Thai company Minor International announced it would acquire a 50% stake in The Coffee Club. The move not only advanced plans to expand The Coffee Club into Asia and the Middle East but also assists expansion of brands such as Swensen's ice creams into Australia. Minor International paid more than $23 million for their share of The Coffee Club. The first Thai store opened in December 2008.

In September 2011, The Coffee Club group acquired Australian steakhouse chain Ribs and Rumps, which Drivas says is a family-friendly brand "appealing to the same customer base" as The Coffee Club.

As at October 2013, The Coffee Club at Brisbane Airport was the busiest in Australia; Townsville's Domain retail centre was the second busiest.

In 2021 The Coffee Club was inducted into the Queensland Business Leaders Hall of Fame, in recognition of its successful development from Australia’s leading coffee retail business into a major, thriving international brand through sustained entrepreneurship.

Responsible business practices
In 2009, The Coffee Club joined the UTZ Certification program, promoting fair and sustainable coffee production.

In 2011, The Coffee Club joined the RSPCA's "Choose Wisely" campaign, promoting humane food production.

See also

 List of coffeehouse chains
 List of restaurant chains in Australia

References

External links

 The Coffee Club
 The Coffee Club (NZ)
 The Coffee Club Digital Story and Oral History, State Library of Queensland

Minor International
Coffeehouses and cafés in Australia
Restaurants established in 1989
Companies based in Brisbane
1989 establishments in Australia
Multinational companies headquartered in Australia